United States gubernatorial elections were held on November 4, 1997, in two states and one territory. Republicans retained both seats.

Election results

States

Territory

Closest races 
States where the margin of victory was under 5%:
 New Jersey, 1.1%

References

 
November 1997 events in the United States